Elections to Thurrock Council were held on 22 May 2014. The result saw the council change from Labour to no overall control. The UK Independence Party gained five seats, three from the Conservatives and two from Labour. Of the 16 wards contested, six were won by Labour, five by UKIP and five by the Conservatives.

Following the election, Labour continued in government, but in a minority administration.

Election results

See also
Politics of the United Kingdom

References

2014
2014 English local elections
2010s in Essex